Jaime Silva may refer to:

Jaime Silva (Portugal), Portugal government minister
Jaime Silva (footballer) (1935–2003), Colombian footballer
Jaime Alcántara Silva (born 1950), Mexican politician